Kalevi Lilja (10 September 1925 – 15 August 1993) was a Finnish footballer. He played in two matches for the Finland national football team from 1952 to 1956. He was also part of Finland's squad for the 1952 Summer Olympics, but he did not play in any matches.

References

External links
 

1925 births
1993 deaths
Finnish footballers
Finland international footballers
Place of birth missing
Association football defenders